The Reunion Tour is a concert tour by American rock band My Chemical Romance. After a single reunion show in Los Angeles on December 20, 2019, a worldwide tour set to commence in 2020 was postponed several times due to the COVID-19 pandemic. It commenced in May 2022, with legs in Europe, North America, Oceania, and Latin America.

History 

On October 31, 2019, after a six-year hiatus, the band announced a reunion scheduled to be held as a one-off event in Los Angeles on December 20, 2019. After tickets for the show sold out within minutes, and following a strong positive response to the news online, the band subsequently scheduled further reunion shows worldwide. Initial announcements centered on a run of summer festival shows in mainland Europe and three nights at Stadium MK in Milton Keynes, England, followed by a further announcement of a North American tour.

Due to the COVID-19 pandemic, all the tour's 2020 shows, including the North American leg, were postponed to 2021. On March 9, 2021, it was announced that the planned England performance in St Austell had been postponed. The band announced in April 2021 that all of the remaining tour dates had been rescheduled for 2022. An additional three tour dates in Australia were announced on May 23, 2021.

Reception 
Angie Piccirillo, a reporter from Consequence of Sound gave the December 20, 2019 performance a positive review, stating: "emo is alive and well in 2019. If you don’t believe it, you should have seen My Chemical Romance reunite on Friday night for their first show in seven years. The legendary emo rock band ended the decade with a literal 'bang', a 'one-night only' gig at Los Angeles' Shrine Auditorium, where the scene smelled just like high school — except this time around, no one was under 21." Other reporters from NME, Rolling Stone and Kerrang! who attended the performance had given the show positive reviews as well.

Opening acts

North America 
 Thursday (December 20, 2019, September 7–13, 15, 20, October 15, 2022)
 Coheed and Cambria (August 20, 2022)
 Dilly Dally (August 20–24, October 12, 2022)
 Turnstile (August 21–26, 2022)
 Soul Glo (August 26, 2022)
 The Bouncing Souls (August 27, 2022)
 Ghösh (August 27, 2022)
 Devil Master (August 29, September 27–28, 2022)
 Waterparks (August 30–September 5, October 17, 2022)
 Meg Myers (August 30–September 5, October 14, 2022)
 Badflower (September 7–10, 2022)
 The Lemon Twigs (September 11-13, 2022)
 The Homeless Gospel Choir (September 15, 20, 21, 24, October 15, 2022)
 100 gecs  (September 18, 2022)
 Midtown (September 21–28, October 17, 2022)
 Taking Back Sunday (September 30–October 5, 7, 11, 2022)
 Youth Code (September 30–October 2, 7, 11, 2022)
 Kimya Dawson (October 3, 2022)
 Surfbort (October 5, 2022)
 Shannon and the Clams (October 12, 2022)
 Nothing (October 14, 2022)

Europe 
 Frank Turner (May 16, 27, 2022)
 LostAlone (May 17–19, 28, 2022)
 Placebo (May 19–22, 2022)
 Witch Fever (May 19, 2022)
 Barns Courtney (May 21, June 7–9, 2022)
 Cassyette (May 21, 2022)
 Charlotte Sands (May 22, 2022)
 Starcrawler (May 22–24, 27–30, June 1–2, 6, 2022)
 Gayle (May 24–25, 2022)
 Crawlers (May 27, 2022)
 Funeral for a Friend (May 28, 2022)
 Karin Ann (June 9, 2022)
 Creeper (June 12, 17–18, 2022)

Latin America 
 White Lies (November 18, 2022)

Oceania 
 Jimmy Eat World (March 19–20, 2023)

Set list 

The following set list is from the Los Angeles show on December 20, 2019. It is not intended to represent all shows from the tour.

 "I'm Not Okay (I Promise)"
 "Thank You for the Venom"
 "Give 'Em Hell, Kid"
 "House of Wolves"
 "Summertime"
 "You Know What They Do to Guys Like Us in Prison"
 "Make Room!!!!"
 "Our Lady of Sorrows"
 "Na Na Na (Na Na Na Na Na Na Na Na Na)"
 "Sleep"
 "Mama"
 "I Don't Love You"
 "DESTROYA"
 "Teenagers"
 "S/C/A/R/E/C/R/O/W"
 "Famous Last Words"
 "The Kids from Yesterday"
Encore
"Vampire Money"
 "Helena"
Encore 2
"Welcome to the Black Parade"

Tour dates

Cancelled dates

Personnel 
My Chemical Romance
Frank Iero – rhythm guitar, backing vocals
Ray Toro – lead guitar, backing vocals
Gerard Way – lead vocals
Mikey Way – bass

Additional personnel
Jarrod Alexander – drums, percussion
Jamie Muhoberac – keyboards

References

Notes

References 

My Chemical Romance concert tours
Reunion concert tours
2019 concert tours
2022 concert tours
2023 concert tours
Concert tours postponed due to the COVID-19 pandemic